The 2016 Knoxville Challenger was a professional tennis tournament played on indoor hard courts. It was the thirteenth edition of the tournament which was part of the 2016 ATP Challenger Tour. It took place in Knoxville, United States between 6 and 13 November 2016.

Singles main-draw entrants

Seeds

 1 Rankings are as of October 31, 2016.

Other entrants
The following players received wildcards into the singles main draw:
  Miķelis Lībietis
  Mackenzie McDonald
  Raymond Sarmiento
  Rhyne Williams

The following player entered as an alternate:
  Sam Barry

The following players received entry from the qualifying draw:
  Yuki Bhambri  
  Liam Broady 
  Daniel Cox  
  Jared Hiltzik

The following player received entry as a lucky loser:
  Tim van Rijthoven

Champions

Singles

 Michael Mmoh def.  Peter Polansky, 7–5, 2–6, 6–1.

Doubles

 Peter Polansky /  Adil Shamasdin def.  Ruben Bemelmans /  Joris De Loore, 6–1, 6–3.

External links
Official Website

Knoxville Challenger
Knoxville Challenger
Knoxville
2016 in sports in Tennessee